
We Have You Surrounded is the fourth album by the American rock music group The Dirtbombs.

Production
Recording of We Have You Surrounded, began in November 2006 as a five song EP. The length of time since the band's last full-length, 2003's Dangerous Magical Noise, led to the decision to finish it as an LP, once again postponing the band's long-planned bubblegum record.  Recording resumed in the summer of 2007, and We Have You Surrounded was released in February 2008.
Far from being a bubblegum record, the album's themes are dark, based on Alan Moore's "Leopard Man at C & A'", which is described by Collins as "a fabulous take on urban paranoia".

Two cover songs were recorded for We Have you Surrounded. The first being the new wave song "Sherlock Holmes", originally by the band Sparks from the album Angst in My Pants (1982). The second cover was of the song "Fire in the Western World" by the garage rock band Dead Moon.

The cover illustration and lettering were done by Gary Panter.

Track listing

Personnel
 Ben Blackwell — Performer
 Mick Collins — Producer, Performer
 Troy Gregory — Performer
 Jim Kissling — Engineer, Mixing
 Chris Koltay — Engineer
 Erik Maluchnik — Engineer
 Patrick Pantano — Performer
 Ko Melina Zydeco — Performer

References

2008 albums
The Dirtbombs albums
In the Red Records albums